Kemptown may refer to:

Kemptown, Brighton, England
Kemp Town, a prestigious residential estate in Brighton
Kemptown, Nova Scotia, Canada